The 2020–21 Atlantic Coast Conference women's basketball season began with practices in November 2020, followed by the start of the 2020–21 NCAA Division I women's basketball season in November. Conference play started in December 2020 and will conclude in March with the 2021 ACC women's basketball tournament at the Greensboro Coliseum in Greensboro, NC.

Head coaches

Coaching changes

On July 2, 2020 Duke announced that head coach Joanne McCallie had retired after thirteen years as head coach.  On July 11, 2020, Kara Lawson was announced as the new head coach.
On April 22, 2020 Muffet McGraw announced she would be retiring as head coach at Notre Dame after thirty three years in charge.  On the same day, Niele Ivey was announced as her replacement.

Coaches 

Notes:
 Year at school includes 2020–21 season.
 Overall and ACC records are from time at current school and are through the end the 2019–20 season.
 NCAA Tournament appearances are from time at current school only.
 NCAA Final Fours and Championship include time at other schools

Preseason

Preseason watch lists 
Below is a table of notable preseason watch lists.

ACC Women's Basketball Tip-off 
Prior to the start of the season, the ACC hosted two media days virtually.  At the media day, the head coaches voted on the finishing order of the teams, an All-ACC team, a Preseason Player of the Year, and Newcomers to watch.  The media day was hosted on November 11&12, 2020.  A selected group of student athletes also took questions from the media on this day.

At the media day, both the head coaches and the Blue Ribbon Panel predicted that Louisville would be league champion.

ACC preseason polls 
First place votes shown in parenthesis.

Preseason All-ACC Teams

Preseason ACC Player of the Year

Newcomer Watchlist

Regular season

Records against other conferences
2020–21 records against non-conference foes as of (March 30, 2021):

Regular Season

Post Season

Record against ranked non-conference opponents
This is a list of games against ranked opponents only (rankings from the AP Poll):

Team rankings are reflective of AP poll when the game was played, not current or final ranking

† denotes game was played on neutral site

Rankings

Note: The Coaches Poll releases a final poll after the NCAA tournament, but the AP Poll does not release a poll at this time.

Conference matrix
This table summarizes the head-to-head results between teams in conference play. Each team played 20 conference games, and at least 1 against each opponent. This marked the first year that teams played a twenty-game conference schedule.

Duke suspended its season on December 25, 2020.Virginia suspended its season on January 14, 2021.

Player of the week
Throughout the conference regular season, the Atlantic Coast Conference offices named a Player(s) of the week and a Rookie(s) of the week.

Postseason

ACC tournament

NCAA tournament

National Invitation tournament

Honors and awards

ACC Awards 

The ACC announced its end of season awards on March 2, 2021 ahead of the start of the ACC tournament.

WNBA Draft 

The ACC had three players selected in the 2021 WNBA Draft.  The ACC has had at least one player selected in sixteen straight WNBA Drafts.

References